Edmund Carter (born 5 June 1785) was an English professional cricketer who made 11 known appearances in first-class cricket matches from 1809 to 1816.

He was mainly associated with Marylebone Cricket Club (MCC) and he played for Hampshire in 1816.

References

1785 births
English cricketers
English cricketers of 1787 to 1825
Hampshire cricketers
Marylebone Cricket Club cricketers
Year of death unknown
Non-international England cricketers